Mangakakahi  is a suburb of Rotorua in the Bay of Plenty Region of New Zealand's North Island.

Demographics

Mangakakahi had a population of 2,244 at the 2018 New Zealand census, an increase of 189 people (9.2%) since the 2013 census, and an increase of 135 people (6.4%) since the 2006 census. There were 723 households, comprising 1,110 males and 1,131 females, giving a sex ratio of 0.98 males per female, with 606 people (27.0%) aged under 15 years, 513 (22.9%) aged 15 to 29, 939 (41.8%) aged 30 to 64, and 183 (8.2%) aged 65 or older.

Ethnicities were 58.6% European/Pākehā, 54.3% Māori, 8.4% Pacific peoples, 6.7% Asian, and 1.3% other ethnicities. People may identify with more than one ethnicity.

The percentage of people born overseas was 11.9, compared with 27.1% nationally.

Although some people chose not to answer the census's question about religious affiliation, 54.7% had no religion, 29.7% were Christian, 4.7% had Māori religious beliefs, 0.7% were Hindu, 0.1% were Muslim, 0.4% were Buddhist and 2.4% had other religions.

Of those at least 15 years old, 168 (10.3%) people had a bachelor's or higher degree, and 381 (23.3%) people had no formal qualifications. 99 people (6.0%) earned over $70,000 compared to 17.2% nationally. The employment status of those at least 15 was that 774 (47.3%) people were employed full-time, 252 (15.4%) were part-time, and 150 (9.2%) were unemployed.

Education

Rotorua School for Young Parents is also located in Mangakakahi.

References

Suburbs of Rotorua
Populated places in the Bay of Plenty Region